The Pinnacle School is a private, co-educational special education day school for students in grades 2 -12 located in Stamford, Connecticut.

History 
Pinnacle is a for profit school that was founded in 2011 by the Greenwich Education Group, which also runs The Spire School and Links Academy, and began with a focus on students with high-functioning autism or Asperger's syndrome. The school later began serving students with language-based learning differences such as dyslexia, ADHD, and nonverbal learning disabilities.

References

External links
 Greenwich Education Group

Education in Fairfield County, Connecticut
Schools in Fairfield County, Connecticut